The Sikkim cricket team is a cricket team that represents the state of Sikkim in Indian domestic competitions. In July 2018, the Board of Control for Cricket in India (BCCI) named the team as one of the nine new sides that would compete in domestic tournaments for the 2018–19 season, including the Ranji Trophy and the Vijay Hazare Trophy. However, prior to the start of the tournament, the team did not have a ground to play first-class cricket on. Unlike some of the other new teams, Sikkim decided to enter their first List A competition with a team made up entirely of home-grown players. Ahead of the 2018–19 season, Sanjeev Sharma was appointed as the team's coach.

In September 2018, they lost their opening fixture of the 2018–19 Vijay Hazare Trophy, to Manipur, by 10 wickets. In the Round 8 fixture against Bihar, Sikkim were bowled out for 46 runs, with Bihar winning by 292 runs, the biggest margin of defeat by runs in Indian domestic cricket. In their first season in the Vijay Hazare Trophy, they finished in last place in the Plate Group, losing all eight matches. Lee Yong Lepcha finished as the leading run-scorer, with 214 runs, and Mandup Bhutia was the leading wicket-taker for the team, with five dismissals.

In November 2018, in their opening match of the 2018–19 Ranji Trophy, they beat Manipur by an innings and 27 runs. In the sixth round of fixtures, Milind Kumar became the first batsman to score 1,000 runs in this edition of the tournament. He did so in the match against Mizoram, in his ninth innings of the competition. They finished the 2018–19 tournament fifth in the table, with four wins from their eight matches.

In March 2019, Sikkim finished in last place in Group C of the 2018–19 Syed Mushtaq Ali Trophy, with no wins from their six matches. Milind Kumar was the leading run-scorer for the team in the tournament, with 159 runs, and Bipul Sharma was the leading wicket-taker, with seven dismissals. However, he left the team ahead of the 2019–20 Ranji Trophy tournament.

Squad

Updated as on 17 January 2023

References

Indian first-class cricket teams
Cricket in Sikkim
2018 establishments in Sikkim
Cricket clubs established in 2018